Teien may refer to:
Teien Township, a town in Minnesota
Tokyo Metropolitan Teien Art Museum, an art deco museum in Minato, Tokyo